Edward Robert Bromley (4 July 1912 – 12 April 2004) was an Australian rower. He competed in the men's coxless pair event at the 1948 Summer Olympics.

Career
Bromley's senior club rowing was from the Mosman Rowing Club. Later in life he was an active participant and supporter of the Sydney's North Shore Rowing Club. In 1938 Bromley was one of five New South Welshman selected in the Australian men's eight for the 1938 Commonwealth Games. That eight took the silver medal behind the British crew.

References

External links
 

1912 births
2004 deaths
Australian male rowers
Olympic rowers of Australia
Rowers at the 1948 Summer Olympics
Commonwealth Games medallists in rowing
Commonwealth Games silver medallists for Australia
Rowers at the 1938 British Empire Games
Rowers from Sydney
Medallists at the 1938 British Empire Games